Paavo Mustonen (born 13 January 1986) in the Cook Islands is a footballer who plays as a defender. He currently plays for Tupapa Maraerenga in the Cook Islands Round Cup and the Cook Islands national football team.

Career statistics

International

Statistics accurate as of match played 2 September 2015

Honours
Nikao Sokattak
Cook Islands Round Cup (3): 2006, 2008, 2009
Cook Islands Cup (4): 2007, 2008
Tupapa Maraerenga
Cook Islands Round Cup (4): 2010, 2011, 2012, 2014
Cook Islands Cup (1): 2013

References

1986 births
Cook Island people of Finnish descent
Cook Islands international footballers
Association football defenders
Cook Island footballers
Living people